Harmankaya Canyon Nature Park is a canyon in Bilecik Province, western Turkey, which was declared a nature park.

The canyon is located between Karahasanlar village in Yenipazar district and Harmanköy village in İnhisar of Bilecik. There are two waterfalls of about  height, and many others of  height. The area covering  was declared as the country's 184th nature park by the Ministry of Environment and Forest on December 26, 2012.

The vegetation of the nature park consists of low trees and shrubs like oak (Quercus), juniper (Juniperus), rowan (Sorbus), terebinth (Pistacia terebinthus), willow (Salix,) and blackthorn (Prunus spinosa).

References 

Canyons and gorges of Turkey
Landforms of Bilecik Province
Nature parks in Turkey
Protected areas established in 2012
2012 establishments in Turkey
Tourist attractions in Bilecik Province
Yenipazar District, Bilecik
İnhisar District